The Professor of Rhetoric at Gresham College, London, gives free educational lectures to the general public. The college was founded for this purpose in 1597, when it appointed seven professors; this has since increased to nine and in addition the college now has visiting professors.

The Professor of Rhetoric is always appointed by the Mercers' Side of the Joint Grand Gresham Committee, a body administered jointly by the Worshipful Company of Mercers and the City of London Corporation. The title is a broad one, and Professors of Rhetoric have included historians, poets, educators and literary critics.

List of Gresham Professors of Rhetoric

Note, years given as, for example 1596 / 1597, refer to Old Style and New Style dates.

Notes

References
Gresham College old website, Internet Archive List of professors
Gresham Professor of Rhetoric - page on the Gresham College website

Further reading
 

Rhetoric

1596 establishments in England